Ibn Abī Uṣaybiʿa Muʾaffaq al-Dīn Abū al-ʿAbbās Aḥmad Ibn Al-Qāsim Ibn Khalīfa al-Khazrajī (‎; 1203–1270), commonly referred to as Ibn Abi Usaibia (also Usaibi'ah, Usaybea, Usaibi`a, Usaybiʿah, etc.), was an Arab physician from Syria in the 13th century CE. He compiled a biographical encyclopedia of notable physicians, from  the Greeks, Romans and Indians up to the year 650AH/1252AD in the Islamic era.

Biography
Ibn Abi Usaibia was born at Damascus, a member of the Banu Khazraj tribe. The son of a physician, he studied medicine at Damascus and Cairo. In 1236, he was appointed physician to a new hospital in Cairo, but the following year he took up an offer by ruler of Damascus, of a post in Salkhad, near Damascus, where he lived until his death. His only surviving work is Lives of the Physicians. In that work, he mentions another of his works, but it has not survived.

Lives of the Physicians
The title in Arabic, Uyūn ul-Anbāʾ fī Ṭabaqāt al-Aṭibbā, is translatable loosely and expansively as "Sources of News on Classes of Physicians", commonly translated into English as History of Physicians, Lives of the Physicians, Classes of Physicians, or Biographical Encyclopedia of Physicians). The book opens with a summary of the physicians from ancient Greece, Syria, India and Rome  but the main focus of the book's 700 pages is physicians of medieval Islam. A first version appeared in 1245–1246 and was dedicated to the Ayyubid physician and vizier Amīn al-Dawlah. A second and enlarged recension of the work was produced in the last years of the life of the author, and circulated in at least two different versions, as shown by the extant manuscripts.

Editions

The text has been published five times in all. When the first edition by August Müller (Cairo, 1882), published under the pseudonym "Imrū l-Qays", was found to be marred by typos and errors and a corrected version was subsequently issued (Königsberg, 1884). Relying on Müller's work, Niẓār Riḍā published a non-critical edition of the text in Beirut in 1965, which was subsequently reworked by Qāsim Wahhāb for yet another edition issued in Beirut in 1997. ʿĀmir al-Najjār published his own critical edition (not based on Müller) in Cairo in 1996.

A team of scholars from the universities of Oxford and Warwick has published a new critical edition and a full annotated English translation of the Uyūn al-Anbā. Their work is available in Open Access at Brill Scholarly Editions.

In 2020, a new translation was published by Oxford World's Classics under the name Anecdotes and Antidotes: A Medieval Arabic History of Physicians.

See also
Ibn Wahshiyya

References

External links

 AlWaraq.net
 English translation of the Lives of the Physicians, translated by L. Kopf, 1954.
 Notes and comments on Ibn Abi Usaibia's work
 A Literary History of Medicine  on the Oxford/Warwick Project and the new manuscripts of the work
 Brill Scholarly Editions containing a critical text edition, English translation, and essays on Ibn Abi Usaibia's Lives of the Physicians.

1203 births
1270 deaths
Historians from the Ayyubid Sultanate
13th-century Syrian historians
People from Damascus
13th-century physicians
13th-century Arabic writers
Physicians from the Ayyubid Sultanate